The Harvest is the third full-length studio album by American Roots Reggae band Tribal Seeds. The album was released in 2009 and debuted at number five on the Billboard reggae charts.

Track listing
All songs written by Steven Rene Jacobo and Tony-Ray Jacobo.

Credits
Performers
Steven Rene Jacobo – Lead Vocals/Guitar
Tony-Ray Jacobo – Keys/Percussions
John Wegener – Bass (Vocals on Vampire and Come Around)
Tony Navarro – Guitar (Vocals on Libertad)
Carlos Verdugo – Drums
Additional Credits
Recording and Mixing – Alan Sanderson
Mastering – Erik Lobson

References

2009 albums